Alfred Frith (1885–1941) was a British-born stage comedian who worked extensively in India and Africa before settling in Australia. He often worked for J. C. Williamson Ltd and appeared opposite Zane Grey in the film White Death (1936).

References

External links
Alfred Frith stage credits at AusStage

1885 births
1941 deaths
20th-century Australian male actors
Australian male film actors
British people in colonial India
British emigrants to Australia